Drinko is a Lebanese beverage manufacturer. It started production mid-2006, and is still operational.

Products 
Drinko currently owns two brand names:
 Six Degrees
Fridge is a carbonated beverage manufactured by Drinko, a Lebanese beverage Manufacturer. It was introduced to the world market by the year 2006. Currently Fridge comes in 14 flavors.

Six Degrees (beverage)

Six Degrees is an absinthe-based carbonated ready to drink beverage that contains 18% alc. volume. It is manufactured by Drinko, a Lebanese firm. Six Degrees was launched in 2010. It is currently found in four flavors: Absinthe Classic, Cranberry, Citrus, and Tropic.

Export 
Drinko's products are exported to the following countries:

 Syria
 Iraq
 Jordan
 Palestinian Authorities
 UAE
 Iran
 France
 Canada
 Australia
 Germany
 Sweden

References

External links
 

Food and drink companies of Lebanon
Soft drinks